

Rock Springs Elks' Lodge No. 624, also known as Elks' Lodge and denoted 848SW7692, is a three-story  by  building at C and Second Streets in Rock Springs, Wyoming that is listed on the National Register of Historic Places.  It was built in 1924 and is architecturally unique in the state.  It was designed by D.D. Spani in Italian Renaissance style, using brick with terra cotta ornamentation.

It was listed on the National Register of Historic Places in 1983.

References

External links
Rock Springs Elks' Lodge #624, at Wyoming State Historic Preservation Office

Buildings and structures completed in 1924
Buildings and structures in Rock Springs, Wyoming
Clubhouses on the National Register of Historic Places in Wyoming
Elks buildings
National Register of Historic Places in Sweetwater County, Wyoming